The discography of British singer Mica Paris consists of eight studio albums, one compilation album, four EPs and thirty six singles.

Albums

Studio albums

Compilation albums

Extended plays

Singles

As a lead artist

As a featured artist

Promotional singles

Album appearances

Soundtrack appearances

Songwriting discography

Videography

Music videos

Notes

 A  Although "Whisper a Prayer" did not chart on the Billboard R&B/Hip-Hop Songs chart, it peaked at number 22 on the US Bubbling Under R&B/Hip-Hop Songs chart.
 B  On "Fast Response", Mica Paris appears under the alias Sara Crimpi.

References

Discographies of British artists
Rhythm and blues discographies
Soul music discographies